The Doll is a 2008 film based on a short story of the same name written by author Charles W. Chesnutt. It was directed by Dante J. James from a screenplay written by James and Joy Kecken. It stars Clayton LeBouef, Monique Brown, Jan Forbes, and Carter Jahncke. Filmed in Annapolis, Maryland, the story is believed to have been set in Cincinnati, Ohio in the early 1900s.

The film dramatizes an episode in the life of Tom Taylor, an African-American proprietor of the Wyandot Hotel barber shop. One day he is confronted with the opportunity to avenge an injustice against his father. He is troubled by whether to choose personal satisfaction over the well-being of his family and community.

The musical score was composed and produced by Anthony M. Kelley. Marian Sears Hunter edited it, with production design by Richard Montgomery and Josh Gibson as director of photography.

External links
 Dante James, The Doll- Interview with Kam Williams
 "The Doll" by Charles W. Chesnutt, Berea University faculty website
 Hollywood Black Film Festival Announces Jury Award Winners
 DMD Films, LLC

2008 films
2008 short films
American short films
2000s English-language films